Marlon Ramsey (born September 11, 1974, in Galveston, Texas) is an American former sprinter.

References

1974 births
Living people
American male sprinters
World Athletics Championships medalists
World Athletics Championships winners
Sportspeople from Galveston, Texas
20th-century American people